The 85th running of Liège–Bastogne–Liège was held on 18 April 1999. It was the fourth leg of the 1999 UCI Road World Cup, held between Paris–Roubaix and Amstel Gold Race. Belgian Frank Vandenbroucke won the race after a solo attack on the Côte de Saint-Nicolas. Dutchmen Michael Boogerd and Maarten den Bakker completed the podium. 71 of 191 riders finished the race.

Race Summary
On La Redoute, a duel unfolded between Frank Vandenbroucke and Michele Bartoli. Bartoli, seeking a third consecutive win and winner of La Flèche Wallonne earlier in the week, attacked on the lower slopes of the climb, before being joined by Vandenbroucke. The two riders sprinted shoulder to shoulder for 10 seconds, before Vandenbroucke broke clear on the steep upper slopes and reached the top with ten seconds on Bartoli, Michael Boogerd and Maarten den Bakker.

After the Côte de La Redoute, with three climbs remaining, a lead group of 17 riders was formed with all key contenders, apart from a worn-out Jalabert. Peter Farazijn did most of the work for his leader Vandenbroucke and countered attacks from Paolo Bettini and Davide Rebellin. On the Côte de Saint-Nicolas,  from the finish, Michael Boogerd attacked early on the climb, but was countered by Vandenbroucke who broke clear and powered on solo to the finish in Ans.

Vandenbroucke, who was second in the Tour of Flanders and seventh in Paris–Roubaix in the weeks before, claimed his first and only career monument win. Boogerd finished second at 30 seconds. Michele Bartoli was distanced by Maarten den Bakker in the final kilometre and finished a disappointing fourth.

Result

References

External links
 Official website

1999
1999 in Belgian sport
Liege-Bastogne-Liege
1999 in road cycling
April 1999 sports events in Europe